The Xian Y-7 is a twin turboprop transport/passenger aircraft built in China. It is based on the Soviet-designed Antonov An-24 series.

Development
China imported the Antonov An-24 from early in its production run and also negotiated licenses for production of the aircraft and its engines. In 1966, Xi'an aircraft factory started the project of local production of An-24. The first Chinese-assembled An-24T had its maiden flight on 25 December 1970.

Production was launched in 1977 at the Xi'an aircraft factory but progress was slow due to the deleterious effects of the Cultural Revolution, with a pre-production aircraft displayed to the public at Nanyuan air base, near Beijing, on 17 April 1982. The WJ-5A1 turboprop engine was chosen as the Y-7's power source. The first production aircraft was not flown until February 1984, illustrating the slow progress (eighteen years from license to production).

The Chinese aircraft equated to the An-24RV, having a full complement of windows and the booster jet engine. The majority of early deliveries were to the People's Liberation Army Air Force (PLAAF), mostly as transports, with a few in 52-seat airliner configuration for the Civil Aviation Administration of China (CAAC). After the initial licensed production run, the Y-7 was developed separately from the An-24 with a succession of upgrades culminating in the Xian MA60 (Modern Ark) series.

A tactical transport derivative was copied, unlicensed, from the Antonov An-26 and emerged as the Y-7H, incorporating the cargo ramp door and military equipment of the An-26.

Variants

Xian Y-7E

Speculative designation for a 'Hot and High" version with more powerful engines.
Xian Y-7G
 A military variant of the MA60 produced for the PLAAF.
Xian Y-7H
 (Huo -cargo) A reverse-engineered An-26 with rear loading ramp for the PLAAF, entering production in 1992.
Xian Y7H-500
Civil variant of the Y-7H certified in 1994.
Xian Y-14
 The original designation for the An-26 copy/Y-7H.
Xian Y-7-100
 Improved version, developed in co-operation with HAECO (Hong Kong Aircraft Engineering Company), with redesigned cockpit and cabin, as well as winglets. This variation has an upgraded passenger cabin interior, with new avionics sourced from western providers. Flight crew reduced to three, it is capable of carrying 52 passengers.
Xian Y-7-100C1
Five-crew variant with equipment changes.
Xian Y-7-100C2
Five-crew variant with equipment changes.
Xian Y-7-100C3
Five-crew variant with equipment changes.
Xian Y-7-200
 Fitted with new avionics; without winglets.
Xian Y-7-200A
 Powered by two Pratt & Whitney PW127C turboprop engines.
Xian Y-7-200B
 Stretched version (74cm (29in)) with WJ5A-1G engines, built for the Chinese domestic market.
Xian HYJ-7
 (Hongzhaji Yunshuji Jiaolianji - Bomber/transport/trainer) A pilot and crew trainer for H-6 heavy bombers fitted with a stabilized HM-1A bombsight, bomb-aiming radar and a TNL-7880 combined navigation system.
Xian MA60
(Y-7-MA60) (Modern Ark 60 seats) A westernized variant of the Y-7 intended to attract more western customers and meet Joint Airworthiness Requirements.
Xian JZY-01 / Y-7 AWACS
 Carrier-based airborne early warning and control (AEW&C) variant. JZY stands for Jian (舰) Zai (载) Yu (预), meaning carrier borne AEW&C, has 4 rudders like E-2 AEW. It is being used as a testbed for the Xian KJ-600.

Operators
Current operators

 People's Liberation Army Air Force
 People's Liberation Army Ground Force
 People's Liberation Army Navy

Former operators

 Phnom Penh Airways
 President Airlines

 Islamic Republic of Iran Air Force

 Lao Airlines - 4 in service
 Lao People's Liberation Army Air Force

 Mauritanian Air Force

 Air Changan
 Air China
 China Eastern Airlines
 China General Aviation
 China Great Wall Airlines
 China Northern Airlines
 China Southern Airlines
 Civil Aviation Flight University of China
 People's Liberation Army Air Force
 Shanxi Airlines
 Sichuan Airlines
 Wuhan Airlines
 Zhongyuan Airlines

 Air Zimbabwe

Accidents and incidents
22 June 2000Wuhan Airlines Flight 343 was struck by lightning and crashed near Sitai, Yongfeng, killing all 42 on board and another seven on the ground. This crash is the worst ever accident involving the Y-7.
19 October 2006A People's Liberation Army Air Force Y-7 crashed into a wheat field near Hengshui, killing two.

Specifications (Y7-100)

References

Further reading
 Airliner World January 2007

External links

 运-7中型多用途运输机 中国人民解放军空军 :: 空军世界 Y-7 Transporter and variations, Chinese
 
 Accident of a Xian Yunshuji Y7-100 operated by Wuhan Airlines - Wuhan, China

1980s Chinese military transport aircraft
China–Soviet Union relations
Aircraft first flown in 1984
Y-7
Twin-turboprop tractor aircraft